Tengku Erry Nuradi is an Indonesian politician who was the governor of North Sumatra. He replaced his predecessor, Gatot Pujo Nugroho, after the latter's conviction for graft by the Corruption Eradication Commission.

References

1964 births
Governors of North Sumatra
Vice Governors of North Sumatra
Living people
Minangkabau people
People from Medan
Indonesian people of Malay descent
Nasdem Party politicians
University of North Sumatra alumni